Hibbertia devitata is a species of flowering plant in the family Dilleniaceae and is endemic to south-eastern continental Australia. It is an erect to spreading shrub with linear to lance-shaped leaves and single yellow flowers arranged on the ends of branchlets, usually with six to eight stamens joined in a single group on one side of two carpels.

Description
There are usually six to eight stamens fused at their bases, in a single group on one side of the two hairy carpels, each carpel with four to six ovules. Flowering mainly occurs from August to November.

Taxonomy
Hibbertia devitata was first formally described in 2010 by Hellmut R. Toelken in the Journal of the Adelaide Botanic Gardens from specimens collected from Carcuma Conservation Park by Eric Jackson in 1985. The specific epithet (devitata) means "shunned", referring to the late description of this species.

Distribution and habitat
This hibbertia grows in dry scrub or open mallee woodland in central western Victoria and south-eastern South Australia.

See also
List of Hibbertia species

References

devitata
Flora of Victoria (Australia)
Flora of South Australia
Plants described in 2010
Taxa named by Hellmut R. Toelken